Don Vaughan may refer to:
Don Vaughan (ice hockey), Canadian ice hockey coach
Don Vaughan (landscape architect) (born 1937), American landscape architect

See also
Don Vaughn, American DJ and neuroscientist